HGM may refer to:

 General Hospital of Mexico, in Mexico City
 Haiǁom dialect, part of the Khoekhoe dialect continuum
 Highly Gifted Magnet, a program for talented students in Los Angeles, United States
 Museum of Military History, Vienna, in Vienna, Austria